James Sayer Dodge, Jr., (middle name also spelled Sayre) (July 2, 1876 – December 4, 1950) was an American football player and coach.  He served as the head football coach at the University of Washington for one season in 1900, compiling a record of 1–2–2. Dodge played college football at Indiana University, where he was the team's football captain.

Head coaching record

References

1876 births
1950 deaths
Indiana Hoosiers football players
Washington Huskies football coaches
People from Elkhart, Indiana
Coaches of American football from Indiana
Players of American football from Indiana